An octave twelve is a type of 12-string guitar fitted with a short-scale neck (15.5inches) and a small solid body. It is tuned one octave higher than a standard guitar giving it the tonal range of a mandolin and enabling a guitarist to achieve a mandolin sound without learning mandolin fingering. The effect is similar to that of applying a capo to a standard 12-string guitar at its twelfth fret. However, unlike a standard 12-string guitar, the courses of strings are tuned in unison, rather than in octaves.

The octave twelve was invented by engineers at Vox, which sold the octave twelve as the mando-guitar from 1964 to 1968. Notable users of the mando-guitar included Brian Jones of the Rolling Stones. Most modern octave twelves are modeled after the distinctive body shape of the Vox mando-guitar. It was also used on the introduction of the Beach Boys' "Wouldn't It Be Nice", from "Pet Sounds".

References

Guitars
Electric guitars